Lavly Perling (born 26 September 1975) is an Estonian lawyer and politician. Since 2022, she is the head of the party Parempoolsed.

She has graduated from Hugo Treffner Gymnasium. In 1997, she graduated from the University of Tartu.

Since 1996, she has worked at different judicial positions. Since 31 October 2014, she was chief state prosecutor of Estonia.

References

External links

Living people
1975 births
Estonian jurists
Isamaa politicians
21st-century Estonian women politicians
21st-century Estonian politicians
Estonian women lawyers
20th-century Estonian lawyers
21st-century Estonian lawyers
Hugo Treffner Gymnasium alumni
Recipients of the Order of the White Star, 3rd Class
University of Tartu alumni